The 149th Regiment Illinois Volunteer Infantry was an infantry regiment that served in the Union Army during the American Civil War.

Service
The 149th Illinois Infantry was organized at Camp Butler, Illinois, and mustered into Federal service on February 11, 1865, for a one-year enlistment.  The 149th served in garrisons in Tennessee and Georgia.

The regiment was mustered out of service on January 27, 1866.

Total strength and casualties
The regiment suffered 31 enlisted men who died of disease for a total of 31 fatalities.

Commanders
Colonel William C. Kueffner - mustered out with the regiment.

See also
List of Illinois Civil War Units
Illinois in the American Civil War

Notes

References
The Civil War Archive

Units and formations of the Union Army from Illinois
Military units and formations established in 1865
1865 establishments in Illinois
Military units and formations disestablished in 1866
1866 disestablishments in Illinois